Hoffmannia is a genus of flowering plants in the family Rubiaceae. They are distributed in Mexico, Central America, and South America.

There are about 100 species.

Species include:
 Hoffmannia congesta – Costa Rica
 Hoffmannia discolor
 Hoffmannia ecuatoriana Standl. – endemic to Ecuador
 Hoffmannia excelsa (Kunth) K. Schum
 Hoffmannia ghiesbreghtii – Guatemala, southern Mexico
 Hoffmannia modesta Diels – endemic to Ecuador.
 Hoffmannia refulgens
 Hoffmannia regalis Hook.
 Hoffmannia roezlii

Gallery

References 

 
Rubiaceae genera
Taxonomy articles created by Polbot